Livermorium (116Lv) is an artificial element, and thus a standard atomic weight cannot be given. Like all artificial elements, it has no stable isotopes. The first isotope to be synthesized was 293Lv in 2000. There are four known radioisotopes from 290Lv to 293Lv, as well as a few suggestive indications of a possible heavier isotope 294Lv. The longest-lived of the four well-characterised isotopes is 293Lv with a half-life of 53 ms.

List of isotopes 

|-
| 290Lv
| style="text-align:right" | 116
| style="text-align:right" | 174
| 290.19864(71)#
| 
| α
| 286Fl
| 0+
|-
| 291Lv
| style="text-align:right" | 116
| style="text-align:right" | 175
| 291.20108(66)#
| 
| α
| 287Fl
|
|-
| 292Lv
| style="text-align:right" | 116
| style="text-align:right" | 176
| 292.20174(91)#
| 
| α
| 288Fl
| 0+
|-
| 293Lv
| style="text-align:right" | 116
| style="text-align:right" | 177
| 293.20449(60)#
| 
| α
| 289Fl
|
|-
| 294Lv
| style="text-align:right" | 116
| style="text-align:right" | 178
|
| 54 ms#
| α ?
| 290Fl
| 0+

Nucleosynthesis

Target-projectile combinations leading to Z=116 compound nuclei
The below table contains various combinations of targets and projectiles which could be used to form compound nuclei with atomic number 116.

Cold fusion

208Pb(82Se,xn)290−xLv
In 1995, the team at GSI attempted the synthesis of 290Lv as a radiative capture (x=0) product. No atoms were detected during a six-week experimental run, reaching a cross section limit of 3 pb.

Hot fusion
This section deals with the synthesis of nuclei of livermorium by so-called "hot" fusion reactions. These are processes which create compound nuclei at high excitation energy (~40–50 MeV, hence "hot"), leading to a reduced probability of survival from fission. The excited nucleus then decays to the ground state via the emission of 3–5 neutrons. Fusion reactions utilizing 48Ca nuclei usually produce compound nuclei with intermediate excitation energies (~30–35 MeV) and are sometimes referred to as "warm" fusion reactions. This leads, in part, to relatively high yields from these reactions.

238U(54Cr,xn)292−xLv
There are sketchy indications that this reaction was attempted by the team at GSI in 2006. There are no published results on the outcome, presumably indicating that no atoms were detected. This is expected from a study of the systematics of cross sections for 238U targets.

248Cm(48Ca,xn)296−xLv (x=2,3,4,5?)
The first attempt to synthesise livermorium was performed in 1977 by Ken Hulet and his team at the Lawrence Livermore National Laboratory (LLNL). They were unable to detect any atoms of livermorium. Yuri Oganessian and his team at the Flerov Laboratory of Nuclear Reactions (FLNR) subsequently attempted the reaction in 1978 and met failure. In 1985, a joint experiment between Berkeley and Peter Armbruster's team at GSI, the result was again negative with a calculated cross-section limit of 10–100 pb.

In 2000, Russian scientists at Dubna finally succeeded in detecting a single atom of livermorium, assigned to the isotope 292Lv.
In 2001, they repeated the reaction and formed a further 2 atoms in a confirmation of their discovery experiment. A third atom was tentatively assigned to 293Lv on the basis of a missed parental alpha decay.
In April 2004, the team ran the experiment again at higher energy and were able to detect a new decay chain, assigned to 292Lv. On this basis, the original data were reassigned to 293Lv. The tentative chain is therefore possibly associated with a rare decay branch of this isotope or an isomer, 293mLv; given the possible reassignment of its daughter to 290Fl instead of 289Fl, it could also conceivably be 294Lv, although all these assignments are tentative and need confirmation in future experiments aimed at the 2n channel. In this reaction, 2 further atoms of 293Lv were detected.

In 2007, in a GSI-SHIP experiment, besides four 292Lv chains and one 293Lv chain, another chain was observed, initially not assigned but later shown to be 291Lv. However, it is unclear whether it comes from the 248Cm(48Ca,5n) reaction or from a reaction with a lighter curium isotope (present in the target as an admixture), such as 246Cm(48Ca,3n).

In an experiment run at the GSI during June–July 2010, scientists detected six atoms of livermorium; two atoms of 293Lv and four atoms of 292Lv. They were able to confirm both the decay data and cross sections for the fusion reaction.

A 2016 experiment at RIKEN aimed at studying the 48Ca+248Cm reaction seemingly detected one atom that may be assigned to 294Lv alpha decaying to 290Fl and 286Cn, which underwent spontaneous fission; however, the first alpha from the livermorium nuclide produced was missed.

245Cm(48Ca,xn)293−xLv (x=2,3)
In order to assist in the assignment of isotope mass numbers for livermorium, in March–May 2003 the Dubna team bombarded a 245Cm target with 48Ca ions. They were able to observe two new isotopes, assigned to 291Lv and 290Lv. This experiment was successfully repeated in February–March 2005 where 10 atoms were created with identical decay data to those reported in the 2003 experiment.

As a decay product
Livermorium has also been observed in the decay of oganesson. In October 2006 it was announced that 3 atoms of oganesson had been detected by the bombardment of californium-249 with calcium-48 ions, which then rapidly decayed into livermorium.

The observation of the daughter 290Lv allowed the assignment of the parent to 294Og and proved the synthesis of oganesson.

Fission of compound nuclei with Z=116
Several experiments have been performed between 2000 and 2006 at the Flerov Laboratory of Nuclear Reactions in Dubna studying the fission characteristics of the compound nuclei 296,294,290Lv. Four nuclear reactions have been used, namely 248Cm+48Ca, 246Cm+48Ca, 244Pu+50Ti, and 232Th+58Fe. The results have revealed how nuclei such as this fission predominantly by expelling closed shell nuclei such as 132Sn (Z=50, N=82). It was also found that the yield for the fusion-fission pathway was similar between 48Ca and 58Fe projectiles, indicating a possible future use of 58Fe projectiles in superheavy element formation. In addition, in comparative experiments synthesizing 294Lv using 48Ca and 50Ti projectiles, the yield from fusion-fission was ~3x less for 50Ti, also suggesting a future use in SHE production.

Retracted isotopes

289Lv
In 1999, researchers at Lawrence Berkeley National Laboratory announced the synthesis of 293Og (see oganesson), in a paper published in Physical Review Letters. The claimed isotope 289Lv decayed by 11.63 MeV alpha emission with a half-life of 0.64 ms. The following year, they published a retraction after other researchers were unable to duplicate the results. In June 2002, the director of the lab announced that the original claim of the discovery of these two elements had been based on data fabricated by the principal author Victor Ninov. As such, this isotope of livermorium is currently unknown.

Chronology of isotope discovery

Yields of isotopes

Hot fusion
The table below provides cross-sections and excitation energies for hot fusion reactions producing livermorium isotopes directly. Data in bold represent maxima derived from excitation function measurements. + represents an observed exit channel.

Theoretical calculations

Decay characteristics
Theoretical calculation in a quantum tunneling model supports the experimental data relating to the synthesis of 293Lv and 292Lv.

Evaporation residue cross sections
The below table contains various targets-projectile combinations for which calculations have provided estimates for cross section yields from various neutron evaporation channels. The channel with the highest expected yield is given.

DNS = Di-nuclear system; σ = cross section

References 

 Isotope masses from:

 Isotopic compositions and standard atomic masses from:

 Half-life, spin, and isomer data selected from the following sources.

 
Livermorium
Livermorium